Wylde Glacier is a glacier situated to the east of Mount Murchison in the Mountaineer Range, draining south between Dessent Ridge and Cape King into Lady Newnes Bay, Victoria Land. Named in 1966 by the New Zealand Antarctic Place-Names Committee (NZ-APC) for Leonard Wylde, scientific officer at Hallett Station, 1962–63.

Glaciers of Borchgrevink Coast